Metropolitan Police Bureau is a unit in the Royal Thai Police, and is responsible for maintaining security in Bangkok - the capital of Thailand. There are a total of 14 divisions (command units) and 2 direct divisions which report directly to the Commissioner of the Metropolitan Police Bureau. The current and 52nd Commissioner of the Metropolitan Police Bureau is Police Lieutenant General Thiti Sawang.

History 
In 1862, King Mongkut appointed British Captain Samuel Joseph Bird Ames to set up a police force in Bangkok for the first time by adopting a model from the British police.

In 1892, King Chulalongkorn appointed Prince Damrong Rajanubhab as Interior Minister with responsibility over provincial policing, including a department in Bangkok. While Prince Naresr Varariddhi the Capital city minister was given responsibility over the city's urban police force, then called the 'patrol police' (พลตระเวน).

On 13 October 1915, both of Bangkok's police departments were merged by order of King Vajiravudh. A single director was appointed to oversee both the police and patrol forces.

In 1922 the Phraya Atikorn Prajak (Louis Chatikavanij) was appointed Director-General to the reformed and renamed Metropolitan Police Bureau. 

Due to the economic crisis gripping the country after the Great Depression and after the Siamese revolution of 1932, the force was disbanded and only the bureau headquarters was retained. 

On 24 August 1948 a royal command re-established the Metropolitan Police Bureau as a police force, in line with the re-organisation of other police forces under the Ministry of the Interior.

Since 1961 the Bureau had its offices adjacent to the Phan Fa Lilat Bridge, however on the 14 October 1973 a student uprising led to the destruction and burning of these offices. The bureau then relocated to the offices of the Fire department of Phaya Thai District.

On 14 October 1992 Princess Maha Chakri Sirindhorn came to unveil a monument to Prince Naresr Varariddhi and the new Metropolitan Police Headquarters at Paruskavan Palace, Dusit District, which is the current home of the bureau.

Affiliated agencies 

 Administrative Division
 Metropolitan Police Bureau Division 1 (MPB 1)
 Investigation Sub-Division
 Dusit Metropolitan Police Station
 Samsen Metropolitan Police Station
 Nang Leang Metropolitan Police Station
 Chana Songkhram Metropolitan Police Station
 Phyathai Metropolitan Police Station
 Makkasan Metropolitan Police Station
 Din Daeng Metropolitan Police Station
 Huai Khwang Metropolitan Police Station
 Bangpo Metropolitan Police Station
 Metropolitan Police Bureau Division 2 (MPB 2)
 Investigation Sub-Division
 Taopoon Metropolitan Police Station
 Kannayao Metropolitan Police Station
 Bang Sue Metropolitan Police Station
 Don Mueang Metropolitan Police Station
 Khokkram Metropolitan Police Station
 Prachachuen Metropolitan Police Station
 Bang Khen Metropolitan Police Station
 Sai Mai Metropolitan Police Station
 Phahonyothin Metropolitan Police Station
 Tungsonghong Metropolitan Police Station
 Sutthisan Metropolitan Police Station
 Metropolitan Police Bureau Division 3 (MPB 3)
 Investigation Sub-Division
 Chorakaenoi Metropolitan Police Station
 Chalong Krung Metropolitan Police Station
 Nimit Mai Metropolitan Police Station
 Prachasumran Metropolitan Police Station
 Minburi Metropolitan Police Station
 Romklao Metropolitan Police Station
 Ladkrabang Metropolitan Police Station
 Lumpakchee Metropolitan Police Station
 Lamhin Metropolitan Police Station
 Suwinthawong Metropolitan Police Station
  Nongchok Metropolitan Police Station
 Metropolitan Police Bureau Division 4 (MPB 4)
 Investigation Sub-Division
 Hua Mak Metropolitan Police Station
 Ladparo Metropolitan Police Station
 Wang Thong Lang Metropolitan Police Station
 Chockchai Metropolitan Police Station
 Buengkum Metropolitan Police Station
 Bangchan Metropolitan Police Station
 Prawet Metropolitan Police Station
 Udomsuk Metropolitan Police Station
 Metropolitan Police Bureau Division 5 (MPB 5)
 Investigation Sub-Division
 Watphrayakhrai Metropolitan Police Station
 Bang Phong Pang Metropolitan Police Station
 Tungmahamek Metropolitan Police Station
 Lumpini Metropolitan Police Station
 Thonglor Metropolitan Police Station
 klongton Metropolitan Police Station
 Phra Khanong Metropolitan Police Station
 Bang Na Metropolitan Police Station
 Tharuea Metropolitan Police Station
 Metropolitan Police Bureau Division 6 (MPB 6)
 Investigation Sub-Division
 Pathum Wan Metropolitan Police Station
 Samranrat Metropolitan Police Station
 Phrarachawang Metropolitan Police Station
 Chakrawat Metropolitan Police Station
 Phlapphla Chai 1 Metropolitan Police Station
 Phlapphla Chai 2 Metropolitan Police Station
 Bang Rak Metropolitan Police Station
 Yan Nawa Metropolitan Police Station
 Metropolitan Police Bureau Division 7 (MPB 7)
 Investigation Sub-Division
 Bangplad Metropolitan Police Station
 Bangyikhan Metropolitan Police Station
 Taling Chan Metropolitan Police Station
 Bangkhunnon Metropolitan Police Station
 Bangkoknoi Metropolitan Police Station
 Bangkokyai Metropolitan Police Station
 Bangsaothong Metropolitan Police Station
 Thapra Metropolitan Police Station
 Thammasala Metropolitan Police Station
 Saladang Metropolitan Police Station
 BorwornMongkol Metropolitan Police Station
 Metropolitan Police Bureau Division 8 (MPB 8)
 Investigation Sub-Division
 Bang Yi Ruea Metropolitan Police Station
 Somdejchaopraya Metropolitan Police Station
 Metropolitan Police Bureau Division 9 (MPB 9)
 Investigation Sub-Division
 Traffic Police Division
 Special Operations Division
 Patrol and Special operation Division (191 Special Branch police)
 Protection and Crowd Control Division (PCCD)
 Welfare of Children and Women Division
 Metropolitan Police Bureau Training Division

References

Law enforcement in Thailand
Royal Thai Police